Guillaume Bottazzi (born in 1971) is a French visual artist.

Biography 
Guillaume Bottazzi is a French visual artist, born in 1971. At the age of 17, he decided to become an artist as a single activity. He began to study painting in Italy. Back in France, winner of a competition, he moved in an artist studio given by French Minister of Culture. Soon he imposed himself on the art. Pioneer of neuroesthetic stream, Guillaume Bottazzi has signed more than one hundred artworks in public space. It forms part of an overall consideration, including various contextual elements. He has received orders from different foreign museums, for example from Mori Art Museum.

He exhibited regularly in galleries and museums in several countries in Europe, Asia, USA, including New York City, where he settled in the 2000s. In New-York, his artworks have been shown by the Goldstrom gallery and the White Cube’s Annex Gallery. In 2004, Guillaume Bottazzi moved to Japan. It was both a culture shock and a new source of inspiration for him. In 2010, at the initiative of Tokyo Metropolitan Government, Tokyo Metropolitan Foundation of History and Culture, the National Art Center, Tokyo, Suntory Museum of Art, Tokyo Midtown, Mori Building and Mori Art Museum, Guillaume Bottazzi created an artwork of 3 m high and 33 m wide at Roppongi Hills, in the center of Tokyo.

Another project, realized in 2011, can be seen in Sapporo, Japan, on the facades of the Miyanomori Art Museum, MIMAS, a work of 900 m², a jewel of Contemporary Art in Hokkaido. An exhibition of Guillaume Bottazzi’s work was organized at the same time.

In 2012, following the selection of the Mori Art Museum, Mori building has commissioned art works from French artist Guillaume Bottazzi. They are incorporated into the new high-rise building Ark Hills Sengokuyama: at heart of the rejuvenated Toranomon district in Tokyo.

Still in Japan, Guillaume Bottazzi is represented by the Gallery Itsutsuji, a mayor gallery in Tokyo. Gallery Itsutsuji is well known to have introduced Supports/Surfaces artists like Claude Viallat, Daniel Dezeuze, Jean-Pierre Pincemin and other artists like Simon Hantaï and Pierre Soulages. His paintings are also exhibited in Artiscope Gallery, a mayor gallery in Belgium. This gallery introduced Arte Povera and from Transavantgarde. His works is part of different public collections as the Queen Shorough Collection and the William Whipple Collection in the United States or as the MIMAS, Miyanomori International Museum of Art Miyanomori Art Museum in Japan.

In 2015, a Guillaume Bottazzi's 216 m² painting became part of the artistic path of La Défense in Paris. The greatest artists, from Alexander Calder to Richard Serra, including Joan Miró, have made their mark on the La Défense district. In 2016, Guillaume Bottazzi was invited to participate to the "Le French May" event, organized by the Consulate General of France in Hong Kong and Macau. This 565 square meters'exhibition took place in Hong Kong Central Library and 23 recent paintings have been shown.
Between 2016 and 2017, in Brussels, with the city and the European Commission, he created a painting 16 metres high that now forms part of the heritage of Brussels-Capital.

Artworks 
In Guillaume Bottazzi's works, diffuse light reflects other spaces beyond their confines, notably through successive transparent, glazed (Glaze (painting technique)) layers of painting. The loose shapes appear to be freed of the laws of weightlessness. Areas disappear into the medium, an integral part of the work, giving an impression of infinity, forming impalpable elements and ethereal shapes. Light is found within space that is uncertain, an impression that is strengthened by the abstract nature of his works. His paintings give an impression of strangeness. His works leads us, the public, to change with them, stimulating our cognitive skills and forcing us to develop our own creative perception.
A study that was carried out by scientists Helmut Leder and Marcos Nadal from the University of Vienna proves that Guillaume Bottazzi’s art reduces anxiety in the people who look at it.

Artworks in public space

Gallery

References

External links
 Bottazzi's official website
 

French contemporary painters
Abstract painters
French muralists
20th-century French painters
20th-century French male artists
French male painters
21st-century French painters
21st-century French male artists
1971 births
Living people
French contemporary artists
French abstract artists